The Captain's Table is a 1959 British comedy film directed by Jack Lee based upon a novel by Richard Gordon. It stars John Gregson, Donald Sinden, Peggy Cummins and Nadia Gray, and featured Maurice Denham, Joan Sims, John Le Mesurier, Richard Wattis and Reginald Beckwith in leading supporting roles.

The film is based on the 1954 novel of the same title by Richard Gordon. This was later adapted into the 1971 German film The Captain starring Heinz Rühmann.

Plot
After serving all his working life with the South Star line, exclusively in cargo ships, Captain Albert Ebbs meets his employer (John le Mesurier) and is finally given command (albeit temporarily) of the SS Queen Adelaide, a cruise liner sailing from London to Sydney. An excellent seaman, he finds that he now has many social obligations that he does not have the skills to fulfil. He must preside at the captain's table, host cocktail parties, judge beauty contests and dance with the lady passengers. He must also cope with amorous widows, young couples who want him to marry them and a blustering ex-army major who claims to have the ear of the chairman of the shipping line.

To add to his woes, most of the officers and crew, led by the chief purser, are on the fiddle. The captain doesn't fully realise this until the last night of the cruise, when champagne being served is revealed to be cider, with the crew pocketing the considerable profits.

All comes out well - just. The captain finds himself engaged to be married to an attractive widow, the chief officer is also engaged to a young heiress, and the larcenous officers are arrested by Sydney police.

Cast
 John Gregson as Captain Ebbs
 Peggy Cummins as Mrs Judd
 Donald Sinden as Chief Officer Shawe-Wilson
 Nadia Gray as Mrs Porteous
 Maurice Denham as Major Broster
 Richard Wattis as Chief Purser Prittlewell
 Reginald Beckwith as Captain's Steward Burtweed
 Lionel Murton as Bernie Floate
 Bill Kerr as Bill Coke
 Nicholas Phipps as Reddish
 Joan Sims as  Maude Pritchett
 Miles Malleson as Canon Swingler
 John Le Mesurier as Sir Angus
 James Hayter as Chief Engineer Earnshaw
 June Jago as Gwenny Coke
 Oliver Reed as Minor role
 Arthur Lowe as Minor role

Production
The film was based on a 1954 novel by Richard Gordon, who had written Doctor in the House and its sequels which had been successfully filmed by the Rank Organisation. The film was made by producer Jack Janni and director Jack Lee who had made A Town Like Alice and Robbery Under Arms.  Jack Lee later recalled:
I thought I'd like to make a comedy, although I didn’t know anything about comedy. I said, “All we need are funny scenes, funny lines, actors who can pull faces, and that’s it’. Joe got a lot of marvellous people writing for it— Bryan Forbes, Nicholas Phipps and John Whiting —and they wouldn’t let me near the script. I liked Nadia Gray very much indeed. She brought a very different quality to the film, living as she did in Paris. Donald Sinden was very good too; it was a fairly conventional part for him, but when I saw the film again recently I was surprised at just how good he was. And we had some good old ham actors in it, like Reginald Beckwith, camping away like mad. 
Dirk Bogarde had been preparing a film about Lawrence of Arabia written by Terence Rattigan and directed by Anthony Asquith which was cancelled by Rank in February 1959 shortly before shooting was to begin. Rank offered no explanation but head of production Earl St John offered the lead in The Captain's Table as compensation. Bogarde turned it down and John Gregson played the lead instead.

Donald Sinden says Joseph Janni told him the film would involve three months' filming around the Greek Islands so the actor agreed to make it. Then this was changed to filming around the Channel Islands, then changed again to the Tilbury Docks. "So for three months we stayed in Southend and commuted to the Docks where myriad arc lamps simulated the Mediterranean sun while the girls tried to hide their goose pimples," wrote Sinden.

Filming started on 21 July 1958.

Michael Blakemore has a small part.

Reception
Variety called it "somewhat scrappy but amusingly lighthearted".

According to Kinematograph Weekly the film performed "better than average" at the British box office in 1959.

See also
 The Captain (1971)

References

External links

1959 films
1959 comedy films
British comedy films
Films directed by Jack Lee
Films shot at Pinewood Studios
Films set in England
Seafaring films
Films based on British novels
1950s English-language films
1950s British films